Simon Gear (born 2 October 1974) is an English cricketer.  Gear is a right-handed batsman.  He was born at Pembury, Kent.

Gear represented the Warwickshire Cricket Board in a single List A match against the Kent Cricket Board in the 2000 NatWest Trophy.  In his only List A match, he scored 27 runs and took a single catch in the field.

He currently plays club cricket for Barby Cricket Club.

References

External links
Simon Gear at Cricinfo
Simon Gear at CricketArchive

1974 births
Living people
People from Pembury
English cricketers
Warwickshire Cricket Board cricketers